Tunapuy is a town in Sucre State, Venezuela. It is the capital of the Libertador Municipality, Sucre.

Populated places in Sucre (state)